Platymantis quezoni is a species of frog in the family Ceratobatrachidae. It is endemic to the Philippines. Its type locality is in the Quezon Protected Landscape, where it is found in limestone karst habitats. It may also be found in limestone karst habitats in Bondoc Peninsula.

Other Platymantis species dwelling in limestone karst habitats are Platymantis bayani, Platymantis biak, Platymantis insulatus, Platymantis paengi, and Platymantis spelaea.

References

 Rafe M. Brown, Louise Abigail Asio De Layola, Antonio Ii Nuñez Lorenzo, Mae Leonida Diesmos and Arvin Cantor Diesmos. 2015. A New Species of Limestone Karst inhabiting Forest Frog, Genus Platymantis (Amphibia: Anura: Ceratobatrachidae: subgenus Lupacolus) from southern Luzon Island, Philippines. Zootaxa. 4048(2): 191–210. DOI: 10.11646/zootaxa.4048.2.3

Platymantis
Amphibians of the Philippines
Amphibians described in 2015